Viktor Lazarevich Zaidenberg (born June 22, 1946) is a Russian professional football coach.

Zaidenberg managed FC Nizhny Novgorod in the Russian National Football League.

External links
  Career summary at KLISF

1946 births
Living people
Russian football managers
FC Nizhny Novgorod managers
Place of birth missing (living people)